Ryan Ottley is an American comic book artist, best known for work on Image Comics' Invincible and Marvel Comics' Amazing Spider-Man.

Career

Ottley began drawing Invincible with issue 8, and continued on the book for 14 years, drawing 127 issues of its 144-issue run. During the course of his work on the book he co-created characters including Battle Beast, Angstrom Levy, Conquest, and Powerplex.

In an interview with comic book website Project Fanboy, Ottley discussed how he got into the comic book industry after being fired from his previous job working in a medical supply warehouse. Ottley decided now was a great time to try to get into comics again and began actively building exposure for his work on the internet through the websites digitalwebbing.com and penciljack.com. 

Ottley penciled the first five issues of Kirkman and Todd McFarlane's Haunt, an ongoing series which debuted October 7, 2009. Ottley indicated on the letters page of issue #5 that he left in order to focus on Invincible.

In 2012, Ottley was one of several artists to illustrate a variant cover for Robert Kirkman's The Walking Dead #100, which was released July 11 at the San Diego Comic-Con. 

In 2016, Image Comics published Grizzly Shark, a three-issue miniseries written and drawn by Ottley, and has an average critics rating of 7.1 out of 10 on the review aggregator website Comic Book Roundup.

In 2018 Marvel Comics relaunched a new volume of The Amazing Spider-Man, with writer Nick Spencer. Ottley supplied the art for 20 issues of the run. He co-created the villain  Kindred  with Nick Spencer. His work drew praise from Jesse Schedeen of IGN, who stated, "Ottley's expressive figure work and dynamic fight scenes make him a natural fit." 

In 2021, Ottley was announced as the artist on that year's relaunched Hulk, teaming him with writer Donny Cates. In November 2022, it was announced that following Cates departure as writer of Hulk due to personal reasons, Ottley would take over as the writer for the remainder of the series, starting with issue 11.

Bibliography

Interior work
The Amazing Spider-Man vol. 5 #1-5, 11-13, 16, 23-25, 30-31, 37, 41-43, 49 (Marvel Comics, 2018-2020)
Free Comic Book Day 2018 The Amazing Spider-Man #1 (Marvel Comics, 2018)
Free Comic Book Day 2019 Spider-Man/Venom #1 (Marvel Comics, 2019)
Grizzly Shark #1-3 (Image Comics, 2016)
Haunt #1-5 (Image Comics, 2009-2010)
Invincible #8-144 (Image Comics, 2004-2018)
Solution Squad #1 (Solution Squad LLC, 2013)
Superman/Batman Annual #1 (DC Comics, 2006)
Tales of Army of Darkness #1 (Dynamite Entertainment, 2013)
The Walking Dead #75 (Image Comics, 2010)
Hulk #1-6, #9-14 (Marvel Comics, 2021-2023)

Covers work
The Amazing Spider-Man vol. 3 #8 (variant cover only, Marvel Comics, 2014)
The Amazing Spider-Man vol. 4 #1.2 (variant cover only, Marvel Comics, 2016)
The Amazing Spider-Man vol. 5 #14, 26-29, 40 (Marvel Comics, 2019-2020)
The Amazing Spider-Man: Sins Rising Prelude #1 (Marvel Comics, 2020)
The Amazing Spider-Man: The Sins of Norman Osborn #1 (Marvel Comics, 2020)
Brit vol. 2 #7-12 (2008-2009)
The Flash #35 (variant cover only, DC Comics, 2014)
Guarding the Globe #1 (Image Comics, 2010)
Haunt #13 (Image Comics, 2011)
Head Lopper #7 (Image Comics, October 2017)
 Inhuman #5 (variant cover only, Marvel Comics, 2014)
Justice League of America Rebirth #1 (variant cover only, DC Comics, 2016)
Manifest Destiny  #1 (variant cover only, Image Comics, 2013)
Murder Falcon #4 (variant cover only, Image Comics, 2019)
Robin: Son of Batman #10 (variant cover only, DC Comics, 2016)
Strange Academy #3 (variant cover only, Marvel Comics, 2020)
The Walking Dead  #100, 150 (variant cover only, Image Comics, 2012, 2016)
The War of the Realms #1 (variant cover only, Marvel Comics, 2019)

Notes

References

External links

Ryan Ottley at DeviantArt
Now Quasi-Defunct Official Site

, Ottley
Living people
Year of birth missing (living people)